This year marked the end of a period known in American history as the Roaring Twenties after the Wall Street Crash of 1929 ushered in a worldwide Great Depression. In the Americas, an agreement was brokered to end the Cristero War, a Catholic counter-revolution in Mexico. The Judicial Committee of the Privy Council, a British high court, ruled that Canadian women are persons in the Edwards v. Canada (Attorney General) case. The 1st Academy Awards for film were held in Los Angeles, while the Museum of Modern Art opened in New York City. The Peruvian Air Force was created.

In Asia, the Republic of China and the Soviet Union engaged in a minor conflict after the Chinese seized full control of the Manchurian Chinese Eastern Railway, which ended with a resumption of joint administration. In the Soviet Union, General Secretary Joseph Stalin expelled Leon Trotsky and adopted a policy of collectivization. The Grand Trunk Express began service in India. Rioting between Muslims and Jews in Jerusalem over access to the Western Wall took place in the Middle East. The centenary of Western Australia was celebrated. The Afghan Civil War, which started in November in the preceding year, continued until October.

The Kellogg–Briand Pact, a treaty renouncing war as an instrument of national policy, went into effect. In Europe, the Holy See and the Kingdom of Italy signed the Lateran Treaty. The Idionymon law was passed in Greece to outlaw political dissent. Spain hosted the Ibero-American Exposition which featured pavilions from Latin American countries. The German airship LZ 127 Graf Zeppelin flew around the world in 21 days.

Summary

Middle East, Asia, and Pacific Isles
On August 1 of this year the 1929 Palestine riots broke out between Palestinians and Jews over control of the Western Wall. The rioting, initiated in part when British police tore down a screen the Jews had constructed in front of the Wall, continued until the end of the month. In total, 133 Jews and 116 Palestinians were killed. Two of the more famous incidents occurring during these riots were the August 23–24 1929 Hebron massacre, in which almost 70 Jews were killed by Palestinians and the remaining Jews are forced to stay at Hebron. The Palestinians had been told that Jews were killing Palestinians. Jews would not return to Hebron until after the Six-Day War in 1967. The other major clash was the 1929 Safed massacre, in which 18–20 Jews were killed by Palestinians in Safed in similar fashion. Elsewhere in the Middle East, Iraq took a big step toward gaining independence from the British. The Iraqi government had, since the end of World War I and the beginning of the British Mandate in the Middle East, consistently resisted British hegemony. In September, Great Britain announced it would support Iraq's inclusion in the League of Nations, signaling the beginning of the end of their direct control of the region.

Early in 1929, the Afghan Civil War saw the Afghan leader King Amanullah lose power to the Saqqawists under Habibullāh Kalakāni. Kalakani's rule, however, only lasted nine months. Nadir Shah replaced him in October, starting a line of monarchs which would last 40 years. In India, a general strike in Bombay continued throughout the year despite efforts by the British. On December 29, the All India Congress in Lahore declared Indian independence from Britain, something it had threatened to do if Britain did not grant India dominion status. China and Russia engaged in a minor conflict after China seized full control of the Manchurian Chinese Eastern Railway. Russia counterattacked and took the cities of Hailar and Manchouli after issuing an ultimatum demanding joint control of the railway to be reinstated. The Chinese agreed to the terms on November 26. The Japanese would later see this defeat as a sign of Chinese weakness, leading to their taking control of Manchuria. The Far East began to experience economic problems late in the year as the effects of the Great Depression began to spread. Southeast Asia was especially hard hit as its exports (spice, rubber, and other commodities) were more sensitive to economic problems. In the Pacific, on December 28 – "Black Saturday" in Samoa – New Zealand colonial police killed 11 unarmed demonstrators, an event which led the Mau movement to demand independence for Samoa.

Europe

Western
In 1929, the Fascist Party in Italy tightened its control. National education policy took a major step towards being completely taken over by the agenda of indoctrination. In that year, the Fascist government took control of the authorization of all textbooks, all secondary school teachers were required to take an oath of loyalty to Fascism, and children began to be taught that they owed the same loyalty to Fascism as they did to God.

On February 11, Mussolini signed the Lateran Treaty, making Vatican City a sovereign state. On July 25, Pope Pius XI emerged from the Vatican and entered St. Peter's Square in a huge procession witnessed by about 250,000 persons, thus ending nearly 60 years of papal self-imprisonment within the Vatican. Italy used the diplomatic prestige associated with this successful agreement to adopt a more aggressive foreign policy. Germany experienced a major turning point in this year due to the economic crash. The country had experienced prosperity under the government of the Weimar Republic until foreign investors withdrew their German interests. This began the crumbling of the Republican government in favor of Nazism. In 1929, the number of unemployed reached three million. On July 27, the Geneva Convention, held in Switzerland, addressed the treatment of prisoners of war in response to problems encountered during World War I.

On May 31, the British general election returned a hung parliament yet again, with the Liberals in position to determine who would have power. These elections were known as the "Flapper" elections due to the fact that it was the first British election in which women under 30 could vote. A week after the vote, on June 7 the Conservatives conceded power rather than ally with the Liberals. Ramsay MacDonald founded a new Labour government the next day.

1929 is regarded as a turning point by French historians, who point out that it was last year in which prosperity was felt before the effects of the Great Depression. The Third Republic had been in power since before World War I. On July 24, French prime minister Raymond Poincaré resigned for medical reasons; he was succeeded by Aristide Briand. Briand adopted a foreign policy of both peace and defensive fortification. The Kellogg–Briand Pact, renouncing war as an instrument of foreign policy, went into effect in this year (it was first signed in Paris in 1928 by most leading world powers). The French began work on the Maginot Line in this year, as a defense against a possible German attack, and on September 5 Briand presented a plan for the United States of Europe. On October 22, Briand was replaced as Prime Minister by André Tardieu. Primo de Rivera's dictatorship in Spain experienced growing dissatisfaction among students and academics, as well as businessmen who blamed the government for recent economic woes. Many called for a fascist regime, like that in Italy.

Eastern 
In May, Joseph Stalin consolidated his power in the Soviet Union by sending Leon Trotsky into exile. The only country that would grant Trotsky asylum was Turkey, in return for his help during Turkey's civil war. He and his family left the USSR aboard ship on February 12. Stalin turned on his former political ally, Nikolai Bukharin, who was the last real threat to his power. By the end of the year Bukharin had been defeated.  Once Stalin was in power, he turned his former support for Lenin's New Economic Policy into opposition. In November, Stalin declared that it "The Year of the Great Breakthrough" and stated that the country would focus on industrial programs as well as on collectivizing the grain supply. He hoped to surpass the West not only in agriculture, but in industry. Millions of Soviet farmers were removed from their private farms, their property was collected, and they were moved to state-owned farms. Stalin emphasized in 1929 a campaign demonizing kulaks as a plague on society. Kulak property was taken and they were deported by cattle train to areas of frozen tundra.

The timber market in Finland began to decline in 1929 due to the Great Depression, as well as the Soviet Union's entrance into the market. Financial and political problems culminated in the birth of the fascist Lapua Movement on November 23 in a demonstration in Lapua. The movement's stated aim was Finnish democracy and anti-communism. The Finnish legislature received heavy pressure to remove basic rights from Communist groups. Politics in Lithuania was heated, as President Voldemaras was unpopular in some quarters, and survived an assassination attempt in Kaunas. Later, while attending a meeting of the League of Nations, he was ousted in a coup by President Smetona, who made himself dictator. Upon Voldemaras' removal from office, Geležinis Vilkas went underground and received aid and encouragement in its activities from Germany. The Kingdom of Serbs, Croats and Slovenes was renamed the "Kingdom of Yugoslavia" as King Alexander sought to unite the South Slavs under his rule. The state's new Monarchy replaced the old parliament, which had been dominated by Serbs.

North America 

In October 1929, the British Judicial Committee of the Privy Council overturned a ruling by the Supreme Court of Canada that women could not be members of the legislature. This case, which came to be known as the Persons Case, had important ramifications not just for the rights of women but because in overturning the case, the Judicial Committee of the Privy Council engendered a radical change in the Canadian judicial approach to the Canadian constitution, an approach that has come to be known as the "living tree doctrine". The five women who initiated the case are known in Canada as the Famous Five. In November, the 1929 Grand Banks earthquake occurred off the south coast of Newfoundland in the Atlantic Ocean. It registered as a Richter magnitude 7.2 submarine earthquake centered on Grand Banks, broke 12 submarine transatlantic telegraph cables and triggered a tsunami that destroyed many south coast communities in the Burin Peninsula area, killing 28 (as of 1997, Canada's most lethal earthquake). Ross-Loos Medical Group is established in downtown Los Angeles by two physicians, Donald E. Ross and H. Clifford Loos - the first HMO in the United States.

The Mexican Cristero War continued in 1929 as clerical forces attempted an assassination of the provisional president in a train bombing in February. The attempt failed. Plutarco Calles, at the center of power for the anti-clerics, continued to gather power in Mexico City. His government was considered an enemy to more conservative Mexicans who held to traditional forms of government and more religious control. Calles founded the National Revolutionary Party early in the year to increase his power; a party which was, ironically, seen by foreigners as fascist and which was in opposition to the Mexican Right. A special election was held in this year, which Jose Vasconselos lost to Ortiz Rubio.  By this time, the war had ended. The last group of rebels was defeated on June 4, and in the same month US Ambassador Dwight Morrow initiated talks between parties. On June 21 an agreement was brokered ending the Cristero War. On June 27, church bells rang and mass was held publicly for the first time in three years. The agreement heavily favored the government, as priests were required to register with the government and religion was banned from schools.

The major event of the year for the United States was the stock market crash on Wall Street, which was to have international effects and be widely regarded as the inciting incident of the Great Depression. On September 3, the Dow Jones Industrial Average (DJIA) peaked at 381.17, a height it would not reach again until November 1954. Then, from October 24–October 29, stock prices suffered three multi-digit percentage drops, wiping out more than $30 billion from the New York Stock Exchange (10 times greater than the annual budget of the federal government). On December 3 U.S. President Herbert Hoover announced to the U.S. Congress that the worst effects of the recent stock market crash were behind the nation, and that the American people had regained faith in the economy.

Literature, arts, and entertainment 

Literature of the time reflected the memories many harbored of the horrors of World War I. A major seller was All Quiet on the Western Front by Erich Maria Remarque. Remarque was a German who had fought in the war at age eighteen and been wounded in the Third Battle of Ypres. He stated that he intended the book to tell the story "of a generation of men who, even though they may have escaped its shells, were destroyed by the war." Another 1929 book reflecting on World War I was Ernest Hemingway's A Farewell to Arms, as well as Good-Bye to All That by Robert Graves. In lighter media, a few stars of the comic industry made their debut, including Tintin, a comic book character created by Hergé, who would appear in over 200 million comic books in 60 languages. Popeye, another comic strip character created by Elzie Crisler Segar, also appeared in this year.

Within the film industry, on May 16 the 1st Academy Awards were presented at the Hollywood Roosevelt Hotel, with Wings winning Best Picture. Also, Hallelujah! became the first Hollywood film to contain an entirely black cast, and Atlantic, a film about the Titanic, is an early sound-on-film movie. The arts were in the midst of the Modernist movement, as Pablo Picasso painted two cubist works, Woman in a Garden and Nude in an Armchair, during this year. The surrealist painters Salvador Dalí and René Magritte completed several works, including The First Days of Spring and The Treachery of Images. On November 7 in New York City, the Museum of Modern Art opened to the public. The latest in modern architecture was also represented by the Barcelona Pavilion in Spain, and the Royal York Hotel in Toronto, at its completion the tallest building in the British Empire.

Science and technology

The year saw several advances in technology and exploration. On June 27 the first public demonstration of color TV was held by H. E. Ives and his colleagues at Bell Telephone Laboratories in New York. The first images were a bouquet of roses and an American flag. A mechanical system was used to transmit 50-line color television images between New York and Washington. The BBC broadcast a television transmission for the first time. By November, Vladimir Zworykin had taken out the first patent for color television. On November 29, Bernt Balchen, U.S. Admiral Richard Byrd, Captain Ashley McKinley, and Harold June, became the first to fly over the South Pole. Within the year, Britain, Australia and New Zealand began a joint Antarctic Research Expedition, and the German airship Graf Zeppelin began a round-the-world flight (ended August 29). This year Ernst Schwarz describes Bonobo (Pan paniscus) as a different species from common chimpanzee (Pan troglodytes), both closely related phylogenetically to human beings.

During the year 1929, there were two solar eclipses and two penumbral lunar eclipses:
 1929 May 9 = Total Solar Eclipse
 1929 May 23 = Penumbral Lunar Eclipse
 1929 November 1 = Annular Solar Eclipse
 1929 November 17 = Penumbral Lunar Eclipse

Events

January 

 January 6
 6 January Dictatorship: King Alexander of the Serbs, Croats, and Slovenes suspends his country's constitution.
 Albanian missionary sister Agnes Gonxha Bojaxhiu, later known as Mother Teresa, arrives in Calcutta from Ireland to begin her work in India.
 January 10 – The first appearance of Hergé's Belgian comic book hero Tintin, as Tintin in the Land of the Soviets (Les Aventures de Tintin, reporter..., au pays des Soviets), begins serialization in the children's newspaper supplement, Le Petit Vingtième.
 January 17 – The comic strip hero Popeye first appears in Thimble Theatre.
January 17 – Kabul falls to Habibullāh Kalakāni's forces, beginning a 9-month period of Saqqawist rule in Afghanistan while the Afghan Civil War continues.
 January 29 – All Quiet on the Western Front (Im Westen nichts Neues), by Erich Maria Remarque, is published in book form.

February 

 February 9 – "Litvinov's Pact" is signed in Moscow by the Soviet Union, Poland, Estonia, Romania and Latvia, who agree not to use force to settle disputes between themselves.
 February 11 – The Kingdom of Italy and the Holy See of the Catholic Church sign the Lateran Treaty, to establish the Vatican City as an independent sovereign enclave within Rome, resolving the "Roman Question".
 February 14 – "Saint Valentine's Day Massacre": Five gangsters (rivals of Al Capone), plus a civilian, are shot dead in Chicago.
 February 21 – In the first battle of the Warlord Rebellion in northeastern Shandong against the Nationalist government of China, a 24,000-strong rebel force led by Zhang Zongchang is defeated at Zhifu by 7,000 NRA troops.
 February 26 – Grand Teton National Park is established by the United States Congress.

March 

 March 2 – The longest bridge in the world at this time, the San Francisco Bay Toll-Bridge, opens.
 March 3 – A revolt by Generals José Gonzalo Escobar and Jesús María Aguirre fails in Mexico.
 March 4
 Herbert Hoover is sworn in, as the 31st president of the United States.
 The National Revolutionary Party (Partido Nacional Revolucionario) is established in Mexico, by ex-President Plutarco Elías Calles. Under a succession of names, it will hold power in the country continuously for the next 71 years.
 March 17 – Second of the Davos University Conferences opens in Switzerland; this includes the Cassirer–Heidegger debate in philosophy.
 March 28 – Japanese forces withdraw from Shandong province to their garrison in Tsingtao, bringing an end to the Jinan Incident.
 March 30 – Imperial Airways begins operating the first commercial flights between London and Karachi.

April 

 April 3 – Persia signs the Litvinov Protocol.

May 

 May 1 – The 7.2  Kopet Dag earthquake shakes the Iran-Turkmenistan border region, with a maximum Mercalli intensity of IX (Violent), killing up to 3,800 and injuring 1,121.
 May 7 – "The Battle Of Blood Alley" is fought by a razor gang in Sydney, Australia.
 May 16 – The 1st Academy Awards are presented in a 15-minute ceremony at the Hollywood Roosevelt Hotel, honoring the best movies of 1927 and 1928, Wings (1927) winning Best Picture. Gerald Duffy (died 1928) receives the only Academy Award for Best Title Writing ever awarded (for his intertitles to the silent film The Private Life of Helen of Troy (1927)).
 May 31 – The United Kingdom general election again returns a hung parliament; the Liberals in Parliament determine which party will govern.

June 

 June 1 – The 1st Conference of the Communist Parties of Latin America is held in Buenos Aires.
 June 3 – The Treaty of Lima settles a border dispute between Peru and Chile.
 June 7 – The Lateran Treaty, making Vatican City a sovereign state, is ratified.
 June 8 – Ramsay MacDonald forms the United Kingdom's second Labour government.
 June 21 – An agreement brokered by U.S. Ambassador Dwight Whitney Morrow helps end the Cristero War in Mexico.
 June 27 – The first public demonstration of color TV is held, by H. E. Ives and his colleagues at Bell Telephone Laboratories in New York. The first images are a bouquet of roses and an American flag. A mechanical system is used to transmit 50-line color television images between New York and Washington.

July 

 July 24
 The Kellogg–Briand Pact, renouncing war as an instrument of foreign policy, goes into effect (it was first signed in Paris on August 27, 1928, by most leading world powers).
 Union Airways Pty. Ltd. is founded, to be nationalised as South African Airways, on 1 February 1934.
 July 25 – Pope Pius XI emerges from the Apostolic Palace, and enters St. Peter's Square in a huge procession witnessed by about 250,000 persons, thus ending nearly 60 years of self-imposed status by the papacy as Prisoner in the Vatican.
 July 27
 The Geneva Convention addresses the treatment of prisoners of war.
 The Red Crescent is adopted as an additional emblem of the League of Red Cross Societies.
 July 29 - the French prime minister Raymond Poincaré resigns, and is succeeded by Aristide Briand.

August 

 August 8–29 – German rigid airship LZ 127 Graf Zeppelin makes a circumnavigation of the Northern Hemisphere eastabout out of Lakehurst, New Jersey, including the first nonstop flight of any kind across the Pacific Ocean (Tokyo–Los Angeles).
 August 16 – The 1929 Palestine riots break out between Palestinians and Jews in Mandatory Palestine, and continue until the end of the month. In total, 133 Jews and 116 Palestinians are killed.
 August 20 – John Logie Baird's experimental 30-line television system is first transmitted, by the British Broadcasting Corporation.
 August 23–24 – The 1929 Hebron massacre: 65–68 Jews are killed by Palestinians and the remaining Jews are forced to leave Hebron.
 August 29
 The 1929 Safed massacre: 18–20 Jews are killed in Safed by Palestinian Arabs.
 The  collides with the oil tanker S.C.T. Dodd off the California coast, causing the San Juan to sink in 3 minutes, killing 77 people.
 August 31 – The Young Plan, which sets the total World War I reparations owed by Germany at US$26,350,000,000 to be paid over a period of 58½ years, is finalized.

September 

 September 3 – The Dow Jones Industrial Average peaks at 381.17, a height it would not reach again until November 1954.
 September 5 – Aristide Briand presents his plan for the United States of Europe.
 September 7 – The steamship SS Kuru sank in Lake Näsijärvi near Tampere, Finland, leading to 138 people drowning.
 September 17 – A coup ousts Augustinas Voldemaras from his Prime Minister position in Lithuania; he is replaced by the brother-in-law of President Antanas Smetona, Juozas Tūbelis.
 September 30 – Fritz von Opel pilots the first rocket-powered aircraft, the Opel RAK.1, in front of a large crowd in Frankfurt am Main.

October 

 October 3 – The country officially known as the Kingdom of Serbs, Croats and Slovenes changes its name to Kingdom of Yugoslavia.
 October 6 – Serie A, the top-class professional football league of Italy, replaces the Divisione Nazionale.
 October 12 – 1929 Australian federal election: The Labor Party, led by James Scullin, defeats the Nationalist/Country Coalition Government, led by Prime Minister Stanley Bruce. Scullin will be sworn in on October 22. Notably, this is the first occasion in Australian political history where a sitting Prime Minister loses his own seat (the second being John Howard in 2007).
October 13 – Afghan Civil War ends.
 October 18 – On appeal from the Supreme Court of Canada  on behalf of "The Famous Five" Canadian women in the landmark case of Edwards v. Canada (Attorney General), the Judicial Committee of the Privy Council in the United Kingdom announces that women are "persons" under the British North America Acts, and thus eligible for appointment to the Senate of Canada.
 October 22 – The government of Aristide Briand falls in France.
 October 24–29 – Wall Street Crash of 1929: Three multi-digit percentage drops wipe out more than $30 billion from the New York Stock Exchange (10 times greater than the annual budget of the federal government). 
 October 25 – Former U.S. Interior Secretary Albert B. Fall is convicted of bribery for his role in the Teapot Dome scandal, becoming the first Presidential cabinet member to go to prison for actions in office.

November 

 November – Vladimir Zworykin takes out the first patent for color television.
 November 1
 An annual solar eclipse is seen over the Atlantic Ocean and Africa.
 Conscription in Australia ends.
 November 7 – In New York City, the Museum of Modern Art (MoMA) opens to the public. The first exhibition Cézanne, Gauguin, van Gogh and Seurat (November 7 – December 7) is seen by 47.000 visitors; the curator is Alfred H. Barr.
 November 15 – Atlantic, a film about the sinking of the RMS Titanic, is released in the U.K., the first British sound-on-film movie and, in its simultaneously-shot German-language version, the first to be released in Germany.
 November 18 – The 1929 Grand Banks earthquake occurs.
 November 29 – Bernt Balchen, U.S. Admiral Richard Byrd, Captain Ashley McKinley and Harold June become the first to fly over the South Pole.

December 

 December – New York toy salesman Edwin S. Lowe popularizes Bingo after coming across the game of "Beano" in Atlanta, Georgia. After someone accidentally yells "bingo" instead of "beano" with a group of friends in Brooklyn, New York, he begins production of the game, going on to develop more than 6,000 card combinations under the E. S. Lowe company, as the popularity of the game grows to become a national pastime.
 December 27 – Soviet General Secretary Joseph Stalin orders the "liquidation of the kulaks as a class".
 December 28 – "Black Saturday" in Samoa: New Zealand colonial police kill 11 unarmed demonstrators, an event which leads the Mau movement to demand independence for Samoa.
 December 29 – The All India Congress in Lahore demands Indian independence.

Births

January

 January 1
 Haruo Nakajima, Japanese actor (d. 2017)
 Latif-ur-Rehman, Indian field hockey player (d. 1987)
 January 2 – Tellervo Koivisto, Finnish politician and First Lady of Finland
 January 3
 Sergio Leone, Italian director (d. 1989)
 Gordon Moore, American computing entrepreneur
 January 4 – Günter Schabowski, official of the Socialist Unity Party of Germany (d. 2015)
 January 5 – Alexandre Jany, French swimmer and water polo player (d. 2001)
 January 7 – Terry Moore, American actress
 January 8 – Saeed Jaffrey, Indian-born actor (d. 2015)
 January 9 – Brian Friel, Irish dramatist (d. 2015)
 January 11 
 Nureddin al-Atassi, Syrian philatelist, 54th Prime Minister of Syria and 17th President of Syria (d. 1992)
 Wanda Wiłkomirska, Polish violinist and teacher (d. 2018)
 January 12 
 Irena Homola-Skąpska, Polish historian (d. 2017)
 Alasdair MacIntyre, Scottish philosopher
 Jaakko Hintikka, Finnish philosopher, logician (d. 2015)
 January 15 – Martin Luther King Jr., African-American civil rights leader, Nobel laureate (d. 1968)
 January 17
 Tan Boon Teik, Attorney-General of Singapore (d. 2012)
 Jacques Plante, Canadian hockey player (d. 1986)
 January 19 
 Edmundo Abaya, Filipino Catholic archbishop (d. 2018)
 Carl-Ebbe Andersen, Danish rower (d. 2009)
 January 20
 Jimmy Cobb, American jazz drummer (d. 2020)
 Masaharu Kawakatsu, Japanese zoologist 
 January 23 
Patriarch Filaret, former Patriarch of the Ukrainian Orthodox Church – Kiev Patriarchate
John Charles Polanyi, Canadian chemist, Nobel laureate
 January 25 – Benny Golson, American jazz musician
 January 26 
 Jules Feiffer, American cartoonist and author 
 Sumiteru Taniguchi, Japanese anti-nuclear weapons activist (d. 2017)
 January 27 
 Mohamed Al-Fayed, Egyptian business magnate
 Hans Berliner, American chess player, writer and professor (d. 2017)
 Barbara York Main, Australian arachnologist and adjunct professor (d. 2019)
 Richard Ottinger, American politician
 January 28
 Acker Bilk, English jazz clarinetist (d. 2014)
 Edith M. Flanigen, American chemist 
 Ali Mirzaei, Iranian weightlifter (d. 2020)
 Claes Oldenburg, Swedish-born American sculptor (Clothespin) (d. 2022)
 January 30
 Isamu Akasaki, Japanese physicist and Nobel laureate (d. 2021)
 Jacqueline van Maarsen, Dutch writer
 January 31
 Rudolf Mössbauer, German physicist and Nobel laureate (d. 2011)
 Jean Simmons, English-American actress (d. 2010)

February

 February 1 – Basilio Lami Dozo, Argentine dictator (d. 2017)
 February 2 – Věra Chytilová, Czech director (d. 2014)
 February 5
 Hal Blaine, American drummer and session musician (d. 2019)
 Luc Ferrari, French composer (d. 2005)
 Fred Sinowatz, 18th Chancellor of Austria (d. 2008)
 February 6
 Sixten Jernberg, Swedish Olympic cross-country skier (d. 2012)
 Pierre Brice, French actor (d. 2015)
 February 10 
 Hallgeir Brenden, Norwegian Olympic cross-country skier (d. 2007)
 Jerry Goldsmith, American composer, conductor (d. 2004)
 February 11 – Gunvor Pontén, Swedish actress 
 February 14 – Vic Morrow, American actor and director (d. 1982)
 February 15
 Graham Hill, English racing driver (d. 1975)
 Kauko Armas Nieminen, Finnish physicist (d. 2010)
 Ibrahim Abu-Lughod, Palestinian academic (d. 2001)
 James Schlesinger, American politician (d. 2014)
 February 16 – Kazimierz Kutz, Polish film director and politician (d. 2018)
 February 17 
 Paul Meger, Canadian ice hockey player (d. 2019)
 Alejandro Jodorowsky, Chilean-French director and screenwriter 
 Patricia Routledge, English actress, singer
 February 18
 Roland Minson, American basketball player and coach (d. 2020) 
 Len Deighton, British author 
 February 21 – Chespirito (Roberto Gómez Bolaños), Mexican actor, comedian (d. 2014)
 February 22
 James Hong, Chinese American actor, director
 Miloš Radulović, President of Yugoslavia (d. 2017)
 Rebecca Schull, American actress 
 February 23 – Patriarch Alexy II of Russia (d. 2008)
 February 24 
 Nils Petter Sundgren, Swedish film critic and television presenter (d. 2019)
 Zdzisław Beksiński, Polish surrealist painter (d. 2005)
 Modesta Lavana, Mexican healer and activist for indigenous rights in Hueyapan (d. 2010)
 February 26 
 Ina'am Al-Mufti, Jordanian politician (d. 2018)
 Paolo Ferrari, Italian actor (d. 2018)
 February 27 – Rube Bjorkman, American ice hockey player and coach 
 February 28
 Hayden Fry, American football player and coach (d. 2019)
 Frank Gehry, Canadian-born American architect
 Rangaswamy Srinivasan, Indian-American physical chemist and inventor

March

 March 1 – Georgi Markov, Bulgarian dissident (d. 1978)
 March 4 
 Columba Domínguez, Mexican actress (d. 2014)
 Cyril Robinson, English footballer (d. 2019)
 Bernard Haitink, Dutch conductor (d. 2021)
 March 6 
 Fazil Iskander, Abkhaz writer (d. 2016)
 Ho Dam, North Korean politician (d. 1991)
 Günter Kunert, German writer (d. 2019)
 March 8 – Hebe Camargo, Brazilian television presenter, actress and singer (d. 2012)
 March 9
 Desmond Hoyte, 3rd Prime Minister of Guyana, 4th President of Guyana (d. 2002)
 Zillur Rahman, President of Bangladesh (d. 2013)
 March 10 – Lolita Rodrigues, Brazilian actress and presenter
 March 13 – Paek Nam-sun, North Korean Minister of Foreign Affairs (d. 2007)
 March 15 – Cecil Taylor, African-American jazz pianist, composer, and poet (d. 2018)
 March 16 
 Gennady Bukharin, Soviet Olympic canoeist (d. 2020)
 Nadja Tiller, Austrian actress (d. 2023) 
 March 18 – Christa Wolf, German literary critic, novelist, and essayist (d. 2011)
 March 22
Yayoi Kusama, Japanese contemporary artist 
P. Ramlee, Malaysian film actor, director, singer, songwriter, composer, and producer (d. 1973)
 March 23 – Sir Roger Bannister, British athlete (d. 2018)
 March 29 
 Richard Lewontin, American biologist, geneticist and academic (d. 2021)
 Lennart Meri, President of Estonia (d. 2006)
 Olga Tass, Hungarian Olympic gymnast (d. 2020)

April

 April 1 – Milan Kundera, Czech writer
 April 3 – Poul Schlüter, Danish politician (d. 2021)
 April 5
 Lucina da Costa Gomez-Matheeuws, Dutch Antillean politician (d. 2017)
 Ivar Giaever, Norwegian physicist and Nobel Prize laureate
 Nigel Hawthorne, English actor (d. 2001)
 Joe Meek, English record producer, sound engineer, and songwriter (d. 1967)
 April 6
 André Previn, German-American pianist, conductor and composer (d. 2019)
 Christos Sartzetakis, Greek politician (d. 2022)
 April 7 – Madavoor Vasudevan Nair, Indian Kathakali dancer (d. 2018)
 April 8 – Jacques Brel, Belgian singer (d. 1978)
 April 9 – Fred Hollows, New Zealand-Australian ophthalmologist (d. 1993) 
 April 10
 Duje Bonačić, Croatian rower (d. 2020)
 Mike Hawthorn, British racing driver (d. 1959)
 Max von Sydow, Swedish actor (d. 2020)
 April 13 – Yvonne Clark, American engineer (d. 2019)
 April 14 
 Gerry Anderson, English television, film producer, director and writer, (Thunderbirds) (d. 2012)
 Paavo Berglund, Finnish conductor, violinist (d. 2012)
 Chadli Bendjedid, 3rd President of Algeria (d. 2012)
 April 17 – James Last, German composer and bandleader (d. 2015)
 April 21 
 Estrella Zeledón Lizano, Costa Rican politician, First Lady (d. 2019)
 Bevin Hough, New Zealand sportsman (d. 2019)
 April 22 
 Michael Atiyah, British-Lebanese mathematician (d. 2019)
 John Nicks, English figure skater and skating coach
 April 24
 Shammi, Indian actress (d. 2018)
 Rajkumar, Indian actor and singer (d. 2006)
 April 25 – Abderrahmane Mahjoub, French and Moroccan international football (soccer) midfielder (d. 2011)
 April 26 – Alexandre Lamfalussy, Hungarian-Belgian economist and central banker (d. 2015)
 April 28 – Evangelina Elizondo, Mexican actress (d. 2017)
 April 30 – Klausjürgen Wussow, German actor (d. 2007)

May

 May 1 – Ralf Dahrendorf, Anglo-German sociologist (d. 2009)
 May 2 
 Eddie Garcia, Filipino actor and director (d. 2019)
 Link Wray, American rock and roll musician (d. 2005)
 Édouard Balladur, 91st Prime Minister of France
 May 3 – Per-Ingvar Brånemark, Swedish physician, "father of modern dental implantology" (d. 2014) 
 May 4
 Ronald Golias, Brazilian comedian and actor (d. 2005)
 Audrey Hepburn, Belgian-born British actress and activist (d. 1993)
 May 5 – Ilene Woods, American singer, actress (d. 2010)
 May 6 – Paul Lauterbur, American chemist and Nobel laureate (d. 2007)
 May 8
 Girija Devi, Indian classical singer (d. 2017)
 Miyoshi Umeki, Japanese singer, actress (d. 2007)
 May 12
 Ágnes Heller, Hungarian philosopher (d. 2019)
 Sam Nujoma, 1st President of Namibia
 May 13 – Ângela Maria, Brazilian singer and actress (d. 2018)
 May 15 – Otar Patsatsia, Georgian politician (d. 2021)
 May 16 
 Betty Carter, African-American jazz singer (d. 1998)
 Adrienne Rich, American poet and essayist (d. 2012)
 May 20 
 Ahmed Hamdi, Egyptian soldier (d. 1973)
Pedro Trebbau, German-born Venezuelan zoologist (d. 2021)
 May 25 – Beverly Sills, American operatic soprano, director of the New York City Opera (d. 2007)
 May 26 
 Ernie Carroll, Australian television personality and producer (d. 2022)
 John Jackson, English businessman 
 Alfred Kunz, German-Canadian composer (d. 2019)
 May 29 
 Peter Higgs, British theoretical physicist and Nobel Prize laureate
 Dwijen Sharma, Bangladeshi naturalist (d. 2017)
 May 30 – Doina Cornea, Romanian human rights activist, professor (d. 2018)
 May 31 
Joseph Bernardo, French Olympic swimmer
Menahem Golan, Israeli director and producer (d. 2014)

June

 June 3 – Werner Arber, Swiss microbiologist and Nobel laureate
 June 4 
 Rolf Leeser, Dutch footballer and fashion designer (d. 2018)
 Karolos Papoulias, President of Greece (d. 2021)
 Kapil Narayan Tiwari, Indian activist and politician (d. 2022)
 June 6 
 Sunil Dutt, Hindi film actor (d. 2005)
 Albert Kalonji, Congolese politician (d. 2015)
 June 7 – John Turner, 17th Prime Minister of Canada (d. 2020)
 June 8 – Gastone Moschin, Italian actor (d. 2017)
 June 10
 Ian Sinclair, Australian politician 
 E. O. Wilson, American biologist (d. 2021)
 James McDivitt, American astronaut (d. 2022)
 June 12 – Anne Frank, German-born diarist, Holocaust victim (d. 1945)
 June 13 – Kurt Equiluz, Austrian opera singer (d. 2022)
 June 16 
 Edith Thallaug, Norwegian actress and opera singer (d. 2020)
 Sabah Al-Ahmad Al-Jaber Al-Sabah, Emir of Kuwait (d. 2020)
 June 18 – Jürgen Habermas, German sociologist and philosopher 
 June 21 – Ramón Luis Rivera, Puerto Rican politician
 June 23
 June Carter Cash, American singer (d. 2003)
 Mario Ghella, Italian racing cyclist 
 Claude Goretta, Swiss television producer, film director (d. 2019)
 June 24 
 Carolyn S. Shoemaker, American astronomer (d. 2021)
 Yaakov Agmon, Israeli theatre producer, manager, and director (d. 2020)
 June 25 
 Eric Carle, American designer, illustrator, and writer (d. 2021)
 Benny Schmidt, Danish modern pentathlete
 June 26 – Milton Glaser, American graphic designer, illustrator and teacher (d. 2020)
 June 27 
 H. Ian Macdonald, Canadian economist and civil servant 
 Gennady Osipov, Russian scientist, sociologist and philosopher 
 June 28 – Alfred Miodowicz, Polish politician (d. 2021)
 June 29
 Pete George, American weightlifter (d. 2021)
 Lalla Fatima Zohra, Moroccan aristocrat (d. 2014)
 June 30
 Othmar Mága, German conductor (d. 2020)
 Ron Phoenix, English footballer (d. 2021)
 Yang Ti-liang, Hong Kong judge

July

 July 1 
 Gerald Edelman, American biologist and Nobel laureate (d. 2014)
 Jack Storey, Australian rules footballer
 July 2 
 Daphne Hasenjäger, South African athlete 
 Imelda Marcos, former First Lady of the Philippines
 July 5
 Chikao Ōtsuka, Japanese actor, voice actor and father of Akio Ōtsuka (d. 2015)
 Katherine Helmond, American actress (d. 2019)
 Thérèse Quentin, French actress (d. 2015)
 July 6
 Hélène Carrère d'Encausse, secretary of the Académie française, historian specializing in Russian history
 Jean-Pierre Mocky, French film director, actor, screenwriter and producer (d. 2019)
 July 7 – Sergio Romano, Italian writer, journalist, and historian
 July 8 – Héctor López, Panamanian baseball player (d. 2022)
 July 9
 Elon Lages Lima, Brazilian mathematician (d. 2017)
 King Hassan II of Morocco (d. 1999)
 Chi Haotian, Chinese general
 July 10
 Franco Graziosi, Italian actor (d. 2021)
 José Vicente Rangel, Venezuelan politician (d. 2020)
 July 13 – Sofia Muratova, Soviet artistic gymnast (d. 2006)
 July 14
 Sonja Kastl, Croatian film and stage actress, teacher, dancer and choreographer
 Kailash Chandra Joshi, Indian politician (d. 2019)
 Syed Rahim, Indian cricketer (d. 2014)
 July 17
 Sergei K. Godunov, Russian mathematician, academic
 Arthur Frommer, American writer, publisher and consumer advocate
 Vasco Modena, Italian racing cyclist (d. 2016)
 July 18
 Dick Button, American figure skater
 A V Swamy, Indian politician (d. 2019)
 July 19
 Emmanuel Le Roy Ladurie, French historian
 Ronald Melzack, Canadian physiologist and professor (d. 2019)
 Orville Turnquest, Bahamian politician
 July 20 – Irving Wardle, English writer and theatre critic (d. 2023)
 July 21
 Birger Asplund, Swedish hammer thrower 
 Idrissa Dione, French boxer 
 Albert Kwesi Ocran, Ghanaian soldier, politician (d. 2019)
 July 22 – Midhat J. Gazalé, French international telecommunications, space consultant (d. 2009)
 July 24 
 Peter Yates, English film director and producer (d. 2011)
 Paolo Paoloni, Italian actor (d. 2019)
 July 25 
 Vasily Shukshin, Russian actor, writer, screenwriter and film director (d. 1974)
 Somnath Chatterjee, Indian politician (d. 2018)
 July 27
 Jean Baudrillard, French sociologist, philosopher, cultural theorist and political commentator (d. 2007)
 Jack Higgins, British novelist (d. 2022)
 July 28 – Jacqueline Kennedy Onassis, First Lady of the United States (d. 1994)
 July 31 – Don Murray, American actor

August

 August 1
 Flerida Ruth Pineda-Romero, Filipino judge (d. 2017)
 Hafizullah Amin, Afghan politician and statesman (d. 1979)
 August 2 – José Afonso, Portuguese singer-songwriter, teacher and activist (d. 1987)
 August 5 
 Ottó Boros, Hungarian water polo player (d. 1988)
 Nathalia Timberg, Brazilian actress
 August 8 
 Ronnie Biggs, British criminal (d. 2013)
 Luis García Meza, 57th president of Bolivia (d. 2018)
 August 15 – Carlo Ripa di Meana, Italian politician (d. 2018)
 August 17 – Francis Gary Powers, American U-2 spy plane pilot (d. 1977)
 August 21 – Ahmed Kathrada, South African politician, political prisoner and anti-apartheid activist (d. 2017)
 August 23
 Zoltán Czibor, Hungarian footballer (d. 1997)
 Vera Miles, American actress 
 Peter Thomson, Australian golfer (d. 2018)
 August 24 
 Yasser Arafat, Palestinian leader, Nobel laureate (d. 2004)
 Alix, Princess of Ligne, Princess of Luxembourg (d. 2019)
 August 25 – Dominique Fernandez, French writer

September

 September 1 
 "Mad Dog" Vachon, Canadian professional wrestler (d. 2013)
 Květa Fialová, Czech actress (d. 2017)
 September 3 – Armand Vaillancourt, Québécois Canadian sculptor, painter and performance artist
 Irene Papas, Greek actress and singer (d. 2022)
 September 5 – Bob Newhart, American comedian and actor
 September 10 – Arnold Palmer, American golfer (d. 2016)
 September 15
 John Julius Norwich, British historian, travel writer and television personality (d. 2018)
 Murray Gell-Mann, American physicist and Nobel laureate (d. 2019)
 September 16 
 Margarita Carrera, Guatemalan philosopher, professor and writer (d. 2018)
 Jamshid bin Abdullah, last Sultan of Zanzibar
 September 17 – Stirling Moss, British Formula One racing driver (d. 2020)
 September 18 – Armando, Dutch artist (d. 2018)
 September 19 – Luigi Taveri, Swiss motorcycle road racer (d. 2018)
 September 20 – Anne Meara, American actress and comedian (d. 2015)
 September 21
 Sándor Kocsis, Hungarian football player (d. 1979)
 Bernard Williams, English philosopher (d. 2003)
 September 22 
 Hédi Váradi, Hungarian actress (d. 1987)
 Carlo Ubbiali, Italian motorcycle road racer (d. 2020)
 September 23 – Johan Claassen, South African rugby player (d. 2019)
 September 24 – Tunku Abdul Malik, Raja Muda of Kedah (d. 2015)
 September 25 
 Barbara Walters, American journalist (d. 2022)
 Ronnie Barker, English actor, comedian and writer (d. 2005)
 September 28 
 Lata Mangeshkar, Indian singer (d. 2022)
 Nikolai Ryzhkov, Soviet and Russian politician 
 September 29 – Giorgio Bàrberi Squarotti, Italian academic, poet (d. 2017)
 September 30 – Mir Hazar Khan Khoso, Prime Minister of Pakistan (d. 2021)

October

 October 2 – Hong Song-nam, 8th Premier of North Korea (d. 2009)
 October 5 
 Yuri Artsutanov, Russian engineer (d. 2019)
 Richard F. Gordon Jr., American astronaut (d. 2017)
 October 9 – Ana Luisa Peluffo, Mexican actress
 October 15
 Hubert Dreyfus, American philosopher (d. 2017)
 Antonino Zichichi, Italian physicist
 October 16 – Fernanda Montenegro, Brazilian actress
 October 18 – Violeta Chamorro, President of Nicaragua
 October 21 – Ursula K. Le Guin, American science-fiction, fantasy author (d. 2018)
 October 22 
 Patsy Elsener, American diver (d. 2019)
 Lev Yashin, Russian footballer (d. 1990)
 October 24 – George Crumb, American composer (d. 2022) 
 October 25 – Claude Rouer, French Olympic road cyclist (d. 2021)
 October 28 – Joan Plowright, English actress 
 October 29 – Yevgeny Primakov, Russian politician, diplomat (d. 2015)
 October 31 
 Bud Spencer, Italian actor (d. 2016)
 Muktha Srinivasan, Indian film director, producer (d. 2018)

November

 November 2
 Muhammad Rafiq Tarar, 9th president of Pakistan (d. 2022)
 Richard E. Taylor, Canadian-born physicist and Nobel laureate (d. 2018)
 November 5 – Lennart Johansson, Swedish sports official and 5th president of UEFA (d. 2019)
 November 6 – June Squibb, American actress
 November 7 – Eric R. Kandel, Austrian-born neuroscientist, Nobel laureate
 November 8 – Jona Senilagakali, Prime Minister of Fiji (d. 2011)
 November 9 – Imre Kertész, Hungarian writer, Nobel laureate (d. 2016)
 November 10 – Ninón Sevilla, Cuban-born Mexican film actress, dancer (d. 2015)
 November 12 
 Grace Kelly, American actress, later Princess of Monaco (d. 1982)
 Michael Ende, German fantasy writer (d. 1995)
 Hind Rostom, Egyptian actress (d. 2011)
 November 13 – Fred Phelps, American pastor, activist (Westboro Baptist Church) (d. 2014)
 November 15 
 Ed Asner, American actor (d. 2021)
 Gombojavyn Ochirbat, Mongolian politician 
 November 17 – Gorō Naya, Japanese actor, voice actor, narrator and theatre director, older brother of Rokurō Naya (d. 2013)
 November 18 – Francisco Savín, Mexican conductor, composer (d. 2018)
 November 20 – Raymond Lefèvre, French conductor, arranger, composer (d. 2008)
 November 23 – Karl Svoboda, Austrian politician (d. 2022)
 November 24 – Franciszek Kokot, Polish nephrologist (d. 2021)
 November 28
 Berry Gordy, African-American record producer, songwriter
 Thomas Remengesau Sr., 4th president of Palau (d. 2019)
 November 30 – Dick Clark, American television entertainer (d. 2012)

December

 December 1 – Alfred Moisiu, 7th president of Albania
 December 6 
 Philippe Bouvard, French television and radio presenter 
 Nikolaus Harnoncourt, Austrian conductor (d. 2016)
 Alain Tanner, Swiss film director (d. 2022)
 December 9 
 Bob Hawke, 23rd Prime Minister of Australia (d. 2019)
 John Cassavetes, American actor and director (d. 1989)
 December 12 – Toshiko Akiyoshi, Japanese pianist and composer 
 December 13 – Christopher Plummer, Canadian actor (d. 2021)
 December 15 – Dina bint Abdul-Hamid, queen consort of Jordan 1955–7 (d. 2019)
 December 16 
 Nicholas Courtney, British actor (d. 2011)
 Arthur Fitzsimons, Irish football player, manager (d. 2018)
 December 17 – William Safire, American author, columnist, journalist and presidential speechwriter (d. 2009)
 December 19 – David Douglas, 12th Marquess of Queensberry, Scottish potter and aristocrat
 December 20 
 Selim Hoss, 3-time prime minister of Lebanon
 Lee Hyun-jae, South Korean politician
 Milan Panić, Serbian politician
 December 22 – Wazir Mohammad Indian-Pakistani cricketer 
 December 23 
 Chet Baker, American jazz musician (d. 1988)
 Monique Watteau, Belgian writer and artist 
 December 26 
 Kathleen Crowley, American actress (d. 2017)
 Taarak Mehta, Indian playwright and humorist (d. 2017)
 Régine, Belgian-French discothèque pioneer and singer (d. 2022)
 December 27 – Tommy Rall, American actor and dancer (d. 2020)
 December 28 – Efraín Goldenberg, Peruvian politician, finance minister and foreign relations minister
 December 29 
 Susie Garrett, American actress (d. 2002)
 Matt "Guitar" Murphy, American blues musician (d. 2018)
 December 31 – Doug Anthony, 2nd Deputy Prime Minister of Australia (d. 2020)

Date unknown
Bernard Zoniaba, Congolese politician and writer (d. 2001)

Deaths

January

 January 5
 Marc McDermott, Australian-born American actor (b. 1881)
 Grand Duke Nicholas Nikolaevich of Russia (b. 1856)
 January 13 – Wyatt Earp, American gunfighter and sheriff (b. 1848)
 January 15 – Sir William Dawkins, British geologist and archaeologist (b. 1837)
 January 24 – Wilfred Baddeley, English tennis player (b. 1872)
January 29 - Paul Gerson Unna, German dermatologist (b. 1850)
 January 30
 Franklin J. Drake, American admiral (b. 1846)
 La Goulue, French dancer (b. 1866)

February

 February 3 – José Gutiérrez Guerra, Bolivian economist and statesman, 28th President of Bolivia (b. 1869)
 February 6 – Maria Christina of Austria, Queen Regent of Spain (b. 1858)
 February 7 – Édouard Hugon, French philosopher, theologian (b. 1867)
 February 11 – Johann II, Prince of Liechtenstein (b. 1840)
 February 12 – Lillie Langtry, British singer, actress (b. 1853)
 February 14 – Thomas Burke, American Olympic athlete (b. 1875)
 February 18 – William Russell, American actor (b. 1884)
 February 24 – Frank Keenan, American actor (b. 1858)
 February 27 – Briton Hadden, co-founder of Time Magazine (b. 1898)

March

 March 2 – Sir Edward Seymour, British admiral (b. 1840)
 March 5 – David Dunbar Buick, Scottish-American inventor  (b. 1854)
 March 12 – Asa Griggs Candler, American businessman, politician (b. 1851)
 March 15 – Pinetop Smith, African-American blues pianist (b. 1904)
 March 18 – William P. Cronan, American Naval Governor of Guam (b. 1879)
 March 20 – Ferdinand Foch, French commander of Allied forces in World War I (b. 1851)
 March 23 – Maurice Sarrail, French general (b. 1856)
 March 25 – Robert Ridgway, American ornithologist (b. 1850)
 March 29 – Sir Hugh John Macdonald, 8th premier of Manitoba (b. 1850)

April

 April 4
 Karl Benz, German automotive pioneer (b. 1844)
 William Michael Crose, United States Navy Commander, 7th Naval Governor of American Samoa (b. 1867)
 April 12 – Enrico Ferri,  Italian criminologist (b. 1856)
 April 22 – Henry Lerolle, French painter (b. 1848)
 April 24 – Caroline Rémy de Guebhard, French feminist (b. 1855)

May
 May 2 
 Segundo de Chomón, Spanish film director (b. 1871)
 Charalambos Tseroulis, Greek general (b. 1879)
 May 12 – Charles Swickard, German-American film director (b. 1861)
 May 13 – Arthur Scherbius, German electrical engineer, mathematician, cryptanalyst and inventor (b. 1878)
 May 21 – Archibald Primrose, 5th Earl of Rosebery, former Prime Minister of the United Kingdom (b. 1847)
 May 23 – John G. Jacobson, American businessman and politician (b. 1869)
 May 25 – Ernest Monis, 56th Prime Minister of France (b. 1846)

June

 June 5
Adolph Coors, German-American brewer (b. 1847)
Sir Cecil Burney, British admiral of the fleet (b. 1858)
 June 8 – Bliss Carman, Canadian poet (b. 1861)
 June 11 – William D. Boyce, American entrepreneur, founder of the Boy Scouts of America (b. 1858)
 June 16 – Bramwell Booth, General of The Salvation Army (b. 1856)
 June 21 – Leonard Hobhouse, British political theorist, sociologist (b. 1864)
 June 24 – Queenie Newall, British Olympic archer (b. 1854)
 June 26 – Amandus Adamson, Estonian sculptor (b. 1855)
 June 28 – Edward Carpenter, English poet (b. 1844)

July 

 July 2 – Gladys Brockwell, American actress (b. 1893)
 July 3 – Dustin Farnum, American actor (b. 1874)
 July 11 – Ali Ahmad Khan, Afghan politician, emir (b. 1883)
 July 12 – Robert Henri, American painter (b. 1865)
 July 15 – Hugo von Hofmannsthal, Austrian writer (b. 1874)

August

 August – Mary MacLane, Canadian feminist writer (b. 1881)
 August 3
 Emile Berliner, German-born inventor (b. 1851)
 Thorstein Veblen, Norwegian-American economist (b. 1857)
 August 4 – Carl Auer von Welsbach, Austrian chemist and inventor (b. 1858)
 August 5 – Dame Millicent Fawcett, British suffragist, feminist (b. 1847)
 August 9 – Pierre Fatou, French mathematician (b. 1878)
 August 10 – Aletta Jacobs, Dutch physician and women's suffrage activist (b. 1854)
 August 13 – Sir Ray Lankester, British zoologist (b. 1847)
 August 14 – Henry Horne, 1st Baron Horne, British general (b. 1861)
 August 19 – Sergei Diaghilev, Russian ballet impresario (b. 1872)
 August 22 – Otto Liman von Sanders, German general (b. 1855)
 August 26 – Sir Ernest Satow, British diplomat, scholar (b. 1843)
 August 27 – Herman Potočnik, Slovenian rocket engineer (b. 1892)

September

 September 2 – Paul Leni, German filmmaker (b. 1885)
 September 12 – Rainis, Latvian poet, playwright (b. 1865)
 September 23 – Richard Adolf Zsigmondy, Austrian-born chemist, Nobel Prize laureate (b. 1865)
 September 24 – Mahidol Adulyadej, Thai doctor, father of King Rama IX (b. 1892)
 September 25 – Miller Huggins, American baseball manager, MLB Hall of Famer (b. 1879)
 September 27 – Johnny Hill, British, European, and World flyweight boxing champion (b. 1905)
 September 29 – Tanaka Giichi, 26th Prime Minister of Japan (b. 1864)

October

 October 1 – Antoine Bourdelle, French sculptor (b. 1861)
 October 3
 Jeanne Eagels, American actress (b. 1890)
 Gustav Stresemann, German statesman, 16th Chancellor of Germany, recipient of the Nobel Peace Prize (b. 1878)
 October 5 – Varghese Payyappilly Palakkappilly, Indian Syro-Malabar Catholic priest and venerable (b. 1876)
 October 20 – José Batlle y Ordóñez, 3-time President of Uruguay (b. 1856)
 October 21 – Vasil Radoslavov, 7th Prime Minister of Bulgaria (b. 1854)
 October 26 – Aby Warburg, German historian, cultural theorist (b. 1866)
 October 27 
 Georg von der Marwitz, German general (b. 1856)
 Théodore Tuffier, French surgeon (b. 1857)
 October 28 – Bernhard von Bülow, German count and statesman, 8th Chancellor of Germany (b. 1849)
 October 29 – Emily Robin, English Madame (b. 1874)
 October 31 – António José de Almeida, Portuguese political figure, 64th Prime Minister of Portugal and 6th President of Portugal  (b. 1866)

November

 November 1 – Habibullāh Kalakāni, deposed Emir of Afghanistan (b. 1891)
 November 6 – Prince Maximilian of Baden, Chancellor of Germany (b. 1867)
 November 14 – Joe McGinnity, American baseball player, MLB Hall of Famer (b. 1871)
 November 15 – Léon Delacroix, former Prime Minister of Belgium (b. 1867)
 November 17 – Herman Hollerith, American businessman, inventor (b. 1860)
 November 24
 Georges Clemenceau, Prime Minister of France, leader of the World War I (b. 1841)
 Raymond Hitchcock, American actor (b. 1865)
 November 26 – Chandra Shumsher Jang Bahadur Rana, 13th Prime Minister of Nepal (b. 1863)

December

 December 10
Frederick Abberline, Chief Inspector of the London Metropolitan Police, investigator in the Jack the Ripper murders (b. 1843)
Harry Crosby, American publisher, poet (b. 1898)
 December 14 – Henry B. Jackson, British admiral (b. 1855)
 December 17
Manuel Gomes da Costa, Portuguese general, politician and 10th President of Portugal (b. 1863)
Arthur G. Jones-Williams, British aviator (b. 1898)
 December 20 – Émile Loubet, French politician, 8th President of France (b. 1838)
 December 21 – I. L. Patterson, American politician, 18th Governor of Oregon (b. 1859)
 December 29 – Wilhelm Maybach, German automobile designer (b. 1846)

Nobel Prizes

 Physics – Louis de Broglie
 Chemistry – Arthur Harden, Hans Karl August Simon von Euler-Chelpin
 Physiology or Medicine – Christiaan Eijkman, Sir Frederick Gowland Hopkins
 Literature – Thomas Mann
 Peace – Frank Billings Kellogg

References

Sources 
 The 1930s Timeline: 1929 – from American Studies Programs at The University of Virginia